The textile industry of the city of Ahmedabad in the state of Gujarat in India dates back to the 19th century, when the city and the industry was established under the British raj. Textile mills employed thousands of people from across the state, and the cotton garments manufactured were exported around the world. The prosperity of the industry was the mainstay of the city's economy. It is called the "Manchester of India". Thus, the Ahmedabad is officially famous for cotton textile works. 

The Arvind Mills is a company that processes denim for jeans worldwide, it is located near the Sabarmati river; as such the water required for the textile industry is easily available. The black soil found abundantly in Gujarat is best suited for the cultivation of cotton which is mostly required for the industry. and black soil is found in Maharashtra also.

Another major company in Ahmedabad is Ashima group. Electricity and cheap labour are available in abundance. Ahmedabad stands very near to the sea and as such export and import becomes easy. Ahmedabad outsources maximum of its cotton fabric from Ichalkaranji, Maharashtra. It is finished here and sold all over country.

Andrew Geddis was a director of the Ahmedabad Jubilee Spinning of cotton & Manufacturing Co., Ltd. and the Ahmedabad Manufacturing & Calico Printing Co. Ltd., as well as director of the India Cotton Association and the Chairman of Mill Owners' Mutual Insurance Association Ltd from its inception.

T.S Textiles is one of the oldest textile company in Ahmedabad, founded in the year 1975, by Mr. Tarlochan Singh Pahwaw. The company produces quality unique fabrics like Double Cloth Dobby’s, Fancy yarn dyed, Satin Lycra, Backside Prints, Twill, Fancy Prints, 4 Way Lycra, and many more.

Bibliography 
 John Irwin, P. R. Schwartz, Studies in Indo-European Textile History, Calico Museum of Textiles, Ahmedabad, 1966, 124 p.

Economy of Ahmedabad
Textile industry in Gujarat